HMAS Olive Cam was an auxiliary minesweeper operated by the Royal Australian Navy (RAN) during World War II. She was launched in 1920 by Cook, Welton & Gemmell at Beverley as Nodzu. The ship operated in Australian waters from 1929, and was requisitioned by the RAN on 3 September 1939. She was returned to her owners in 1946 before being wrecked near Green Cape Lighthouse, Eden, New South Wales on 2 November 1954 with the loss of three lives.

Operational history

Nodzu was purchased by Cam & Sons Pty Ltd and sailed to Sydney, Australia in 1929 and was renamed Olive Cam. In September 1939, Olive Cam was requisitioned by the RAN for use as an auxiliary and commissioned on 6 October 1939.

During the war, Olive Cam was based in Fremantle with Minesweeping Group 66 and operated along the West Australian coastline. She was returned to her owners in 1946.

On 2 November 1954, she was wrecked  near Green Cape Lighthouse, Eden, New South Wales, causing the deaths of three of her crewmen.

Citations

References
 http://www.navyhistory.org.au/06-october-1939/

1920 ships
Minesweepers of the Royal Australian Navy
Shipwrecks of the Far South Coast Region
Maritime incidents in 1954
1954 in Australia
Iron and steel steamships of Australia